Desmond Fitzmaurice (16 October 1917 – 19 January 1981) was an Australian cricketer. He played 17 first-class cricket matches for Victoria between 1947 and 1950.

See also
 List of Victoria first-class cricketers

References

External links
 

1917 births
1981 deaths
Australian cricketers
Victoria cricketers
Cricketers from Melbourne